Babi panggang refers to a variety of recipes for Indonesian grilled pork dishes, 'babi' meaning pig or pork, and 'panggang' meaning grilled or roasted in the Indonesian language.

Batak babi panggang
Babi panggang Karo and Babi panggang Toba are two similar dishes made by the Christian Batak Toba and Batak Karo of North Sumatra. Pigs are slaughtered and used in their entirety to make babi panggang—bones for a clear soup, meat (including offal) to be grilled, and blood for a dipping sauce. Babi panggang Karo usually accompanied by clear pork bone soup, processed pork blood as dipping sauce, daun ubi tumbuk or mashed sweet potato leaves, and tuak or a drink of nira sap. The three dishes are served with plain rice and a sambal andaliman, made from fresh sichuan pepper.

Chinese babi panggang

In other parts of Indonesia and also Malaysia, where the Chinese are the main pork-eating population, babi panggang may simply be a local term for standard Chinese pork dishes—babi panggang putih is siu yook, and babi panggang merah is Chinese char siu.

Dutch babi pangang
In the West, chiefly in The Netherlands, babi panggang is a pork dish served with a tomato-based sauce. This Dutch/Indonesian/Chinese fusion dish is also known as babi panggang speciaal in the Netherlands, and the sauce as speciaal saus (lit.: "special sauce").

This fusion version of babi panggang became popular in the Netherlands and Flanders through so-called "Chinese-Indonesian restaurants", common in the Netherlands since the late 1960s and early 1970s. These restaurants are mainly owned and run by immigrants from Hong Kong. The dish consists of slices of crispy deep fried pork served on a bed of acar campur (a pickle-like salad made with thinly sliced white cabbage and carrots of Indonesian origin; it is written atjar tjampoer in Dutch) over which a generous amount of the sauce is poured. It is highly probable that the dish was developed by Cantonese cooks, either in the former Dutch East Indies (present day Indonesia) or in the Netherlands itself after the large influx of Asians and Eurasians following the loss of its Indonesian colony and the advent of large scale international migration world-wide.

Sauce

The accompanying sauce for the Dutch version is similar to other tomato-based sweet and sour sauces common in Cantonese cuisine. Most recipes for this sauce include tomato puree, ketchup or fresh tomatoes, fresh or powdered ginger, water, vinegar, salt and a large amount of sugar. Recipes may also include onion, garlic, soy sauce, sambal, fresh chili peppers, sherry or rice wine, broth, MSG and cornstarch for thickening.

See also 

Sweet and sour pork
Sweet and sour sauce
Indonesian cuisine
Pork consumption in Asian countries

References 

Indonesian cuisine
Batak cuisine
Indonesian Chinese cuisine
Cantonese cuisine
Indonesian fusion cuisine
Chinese fusion cuisine
Dutch fusion cuisine
Indonesian words and phrases
Chinese pork dishes